The 1949–50 Kentucky Wildcats men's basketball team represented University of Kentucky as a member of the Southeast Conference. The head coach was Adolph Rupp and the team played their home games at Alumni Gymnasium for the final season. The Wildcats won SEC regular season and tournament championships. After losing to eventual National Invitation Tournament champion CCNY, Kentucky finished the season with a record of 25–5 (11–2 SEC).

Charles Newton, a player on this squad, returned to Kentucky as athletic director from 1989 to 2000.

Roster

Schedule and results

|-
!colspan=9 style=| Regular Season

|-
!colspan=9 style=| SEC Tournament

|-
!colspan=9 style=| National Invitation Tournament

Rankings

Team players drafted into the NBA
No one from the Wildcats men's team was selected in the 1950 NBA Draft.

References

Kentucky
Kentucky
Kentucky Wildcats men's basketball seasons
Kentucky Wildcats men's basketball
Kentucky Wildcats men's basketball